Nathalie Lindborg (born 15 April 1991) is a Swedish freestyle swimmer. She competed in the women's 4 × 100 metre freestyle relay event at the 2017 World Aquatics Championships.

References

External links
 

1991 births
Living people
Place of birth missing (living people)
Swedish female freestyle swimmers